Candaele is a surname. Notable people with the surname include:

Casey Candaele (born 1961), American baseball player and coach
Kelly Candaele, American politician, filmmaker, teacher, and writer